Wang Enge (born 24 January 1957) is a Chinese physicist and academician of the Chinese Academy of Sciences. He succeeded Zhou Qifeng to the office of the President of Peking University on 22 March 2013. From 15 February 2015, he becomes the Vice President of Chinese Academy of Sciences.

Life

Early life
Wang was born into a wealthy and highly educated family in Shenyang, Liaoning. During the Down to the Countryside Movement, he became a sent-down youth in Liaozhong County. After the Cultural Revolution, he was accepted to Liaoning University in December 1977, obtaining a B.S. and M.S. in theoretical physics. Before graduation, Wang went to study in America at Princeton University.  Wang received his Ph.D. from Peking University in July 1990.  In January 1992, Wang attended the University of Lille Nord de France.

Career
In 2007, Wang was elected an academician of the Chinese Academy of Sciences, at the age of 50. In 2009, Wang served as the President of School of Physics of Peking University. On 22 March 2013, Wang was promoted to become the President of Peking University. He is a recipient of the 2005 TWAS Prize. Wang also received the Advanced Materials Laureate in 2018.

Work
 Y. Guo, Y.F. Zhang, X.Y. Bao, T.Z. Han, Z. Tang, L.X. Zhang, W.G. Zhu, E.G. Wang, Q. Niu, Z.Q. Qiu, J.F. Jia, Z.X Zhao, and Q.K. Xue, Science 306, 1915 (2004), Superconductivity modulated by quantum size effects.
 G. Y. Zhang, X.D. Bai, X. Jiang, and E.G. Wang, Science 303, 766d (2004), Tubular Graphite Cones -Response. 
 G. Y. Zhang, X. Jiang, and E.G. Wang, Science 300, 472 (2003), Tubular Graphite Cones.
 Xiaolin Li, Guangyu Zhang, Xuedong Bai, Xiaoming Sun, Xinran Wang, Enge Wang and Hongjie Dai, Nature Nanotechnology 3, 538(2008), Highly conducting graphene sheets and Langmuir–Blodgett films.

References

1957 births
Living people
Educators from Liaoning
Liaoning University alumni
Peking University alumni
People from Shenyang
Presidents of Peking University
Physicists from Liaoning
TWAS laureates
University of Lille Nord de France alumni